Macrocoma djurdjurensis is a species of leaf beetle of Algeria, described by  in 2001.

References

djurdjurensis
Beetles of North Africa
Beetles described in 2001
Endemic fauna of Algeria